Paul Persaud (born 19 August 1971) is a Guyanese cricketer. He played in seventeen first-class and eleven List A matches for Guyana from 1990 to 1995.

See also
 List of Guyanese representative cricketers

References

External links
 

1971 births
Living people
Guyanese cricketers
Guyana cricketers
Sportspeople from Georgetown, Guyana